In French law, Letters of Pareatis were documents required for the extension of a legal decision into jurisdictions other than that where it was originally made.  The "Gallican liberties" included a requirement that papal decisions would not have effect in France without the King's Pareatis.

External links
Description of lettres de Pareatis in Lexique de l'ancien regime

Law of France